Scott Wexton, also known by his stage name Voodoo Organist, is an American vocalist and keyboardist. He has also served as a member of the noise rock/post-hardcore group Today Is the Day and as a founding member of the band Batterie:Acid. Since 2001, he has recorded solo work and performed under the name Voodoo Organist.

Biography
Scott Wexton was born in Detroit, Michigan and began playing the organ at the age of ten as a Catholic altar boy. He started Tribe in Detroit with percussionist Christopher Gwizdala in 1991. The duo expanded its membership to five members and became Batterie:Acid in 1992. Their releases were limited to several hundred pressings on cassette tape. The group dissolved in 1995 and Wexton moved to Nashville where he was recruited to play the sampler in Today Is the Day with singer/guitarist Steve Austin and drummer Brad Elrod. He recorded an album with them, the self-titled Today Is the Day released in 1996. The following year, he and Elrod collaborated on a project known as Trance End.

In 2001, Wexton had a near death experience when he began bleeding internally and was rushed to the emergency room, where he was diagnosed with Crohn's disease. The episode affected Wexton, who became aware of his own mortality and his need to express his individual musical creativity. He quit his day job and began a solo musical project called Voodoo Organist, booking two consecutive tours for himself and composing an album's worth of material.

Discography

References

External links

Living people
Musicians from California
Musicians from Detroit
American rock keyboardists
American heavy metal keyboardists
Today Is the Day members
Year of birth missing (living people)